Clinton Township is one of nine townships in Decatur County, Indiana. As of the 2010 census, its population was 513 and it contained 191 housing units.

History
Clinton Township was organized in 1829.

Geography

Unincorporated towns
 Sandusky
 Springhill (extinct)
 Williamstown

Adjacent townships
 Anderson Township, Rush County (north)
 Fugit Township (east)
 Washington Township (south)
 Adams Township (west)

Major highways
  Indiana State Road 3

Cemeteries
The township contains three cemeteries: Butcher, McLaughlin and Swails.

References

 
 United States Census Bureau cartographic boundary files

External links

 Indiana Township Association
 United Township Association of Indiana

Townships in Decatur County, Indiana
Townships in Indiana
1829 establishments in Indiana
Populated places established in 1829